The Weltklasse in Köln was an annual one-day outdoor track and field meeting at the Müngersdorfer Stadion in Cologne, Germany. First held in 1934, it was organised by ASV Köln each August until 1999, when the meeting folded after its fiftieth edition due to financial reasons. Despite the meeting's long history, it was not included in the IAAF's international circuit, although it did receive IAAF Grand Prix status for its final edition.

Earlier in its history, the meeting was known as the ASV-Sportfest or Internationale Leichtathletik-Sportfest. Following its establishment in 1934, the meeting's second edition hosted several newly-crowned Olympic champions in 1936 after the Berlin Olympics. It played host to the German Athletics Championships in 1947. The meeting returned after World War II with a meeting in 1952 and the first world record was set at the stadium in 1958, courtesy of the German men's 4 × 100 metres relay team. The 1980s and 1990s saw several more world records set at the Müngersdorfer Stadion. Former sprinter Manfred Germar was head of the organising committee for its final three decades.

World records

References

Defunct athletics competitions
Athletics competitions in Germany
Sports competitions in Cologne
IAAF Grand Prix
Recurring sporting events established in 1934
Recurring sporting events disestablished in 1999
1934 establishments in Germany
1999 disestablishments in Germany
Defunct sports competitions in Germany